León Darío Muñoz Hernández (born February 21, 1977) is a Colombian former football player who was an outstanding player in his early career with Atlético Nacional and Palmeiras.  He excels on his speed and is known as being a top scorer.

External links 
 

1977 births
Living people
Footballers from Medellín
Colombian footballers
Colombian expatriate footballers
Categoría Primera A players
Campeonato Brasileiro Série A players
Atlético Nacional footballers
Envigado F.C. players
Deportes Quindío footballers
Colombia international footballers
Coritiba Foot Ball Club players
Sociedade Esportiva Palmeiras players
Millonarios F.C. players
Deportivo Pereira footballers
Expatriate footballers in Brazil

Association football forwards